Marco Schönbächler (born 11 January 1990) is a Swiss professional footballer who plays as a right midfielder.

Career
Schönbächler was part of the 2006–07 and 2008–2009 Swiss Championship winning team.

On 17 August 2013, Schönbächler scored a hat-trick for Zürich in the first round of the Swiss Cup, leading his side to a 6–0 victory over FC Bassersdorf. In the next round on 15 September 2013, Schönbächler scored Zürich's second goal, as his side twice came from behind to defeat Stade Lausanne Ouchy 3–2. Schönbächler's goal-scoring streak continued into the quarter-finals, as he scored Zürich's equalizing goal in an eventual 4–1 defeat of FC Baden in the quarter-finals on 9 November. His first league goal of the season came on 24 November, scoring Zürich's second goal in a 4–1 defeat of FC Sion.

Honours
FC Zürich
Swiss Super League: 2006–07, 2008–09
Swiss Cup: 2013–14, 2015–16, 2017–18

References

1990 births
Living people
Association football midfielders
Swiss men's footballers
Switzerland youth international footballers
Switzerland under-21 international footballers
Switzerland international footballers
Swiss Super League players
FC Zürich players